Amelin  is a village in the administrative district of Gmina Krasnosielc, within Maków County, Masovian Voivodeship, in east-central Poland.

The village has a population of 220.

References

Amelin